Malaya Dora is a rural locality (a village) in Sudskoye Rural Settlement, Cherepovetsky District, Vologda Oblast, Russia. The population was 7 as of 2002. There are 2 streets.

Geography 
Bolshaya Dora is the nearest rural locality.

References 

Rural localities in Cherepovetsky District